Punjab Kesari is 1938 Tamil-language thriller film directed by Fram Sethna. It was adapted from Te. Po. Krishnasami Pavalar's play of the same name. The film adaptation stars K. P. Kesavan, P. U. Chinnappa, Kali N. Rathnam and A. K. Rajalakshmi.

Plot 
Sundaranathan is in love with Padma Bai (A. K. Rajalakshmi), the daughter of the wealthy Somanathan Prabhu. Somanathan Prabhu decides to get his daughter married to Sundaranathan, but a villain lusts for her and her wealth. His gang kills Somanathan and frames Sundaranathan, who is arrested. A doctor hires detective Punjab Kesari to uncover the truth. Punjab Kesari and his assistant Karappanpoochi unmask the killer and the truth. Sudaranathan is exonerated, and marries Padma Bai.

Cast 

 K. P. Kesavan as Punjab Kesari
P. U. Chinnappa as Sundaranathan
 A. K. Rajalakshmi as Padma Bai
Kali N. Rathnam as Karapaanpoochi
 K. K. Perumal as the villain
 H. H. Sarma as Somanathan Prabhu
 Kannan as the doctor

Production 
Punjab Kesari was a popular play written by Te. Po. Krishnaswamy Pavalar. It was staged all over the Tamil-speaking areas of the Madras Presidency and also in neighbouring countries like Ceylon (now Sri Lanka), Malaya (now Singapore and Malaysia) and Burma (now Myanmar). The play's title was an allegorical reference to the Indian freedom fighter Lala Lajpat Rai, who was popularly known as Punjab Kesari. Following the play's success, it was adapted into a feature film with the same title, directed by the Bombay-based Parsi filmmaker Fram Sethna and produced by the studio Star Films. Shooting took place at the National Movietone Studio, Madras. The final length of the film measured .

Soundtrack 
The film's opening song was the Bankim Chandra Chatterjee-written "Vande Mataram", which urged Tamil people to participate in the Indian independence movement. Another song used in the film was the Tyagaraja composition "Tholi Nenu Chesina Pooja Palamu", with vocals the by lead actress A. K. Rajalakshmi.

Reception 
Film historian Randor Guy praised the performances of the cast and the storyline, though he felt it was "somewhat predictable". The film was an average success.

References 

1930s Tamil-language films
1930s thriller films
1938 films
Fictional portrayals of the Tamil Nadu Police
Films about organised crime in India
Films set in 1938
Films set in Chennai
Indian black-and-white films
Indian films based on plays
Films scored by Kunnakudi Venkatarama Iyer
Indian thriller films